Swimming to Cambodia, also known as Spalding Gray's Swimming to Cambodia, is a 1987 American concert film written by and starring Spalding Gray, and directed by Jonathan Demme. The performance film is of Gray's play and monologue, which centered on such themes as his trip to Southeast Asia to create the role of the U.S. Ambassador's aide in the film The Killing Fields, the Cold War, Cambodia Year Zero, and his search for his "perfect moment".  It was nominated for Best Feature, Best Director, Best Actor, and Best Screenplay at the 1988 Independent Spirit Awards.

Background
Over a period of two years, Gray originally developed Swimming to Cambodia as a theatre performance piece.  The original running time of the performance was four hours, and it was presented over two nights. Gray received a Special Citation for this work at the 1985 Obie Awards.

In 2001, Gray revived Swimming to Cambodia, performing it on stage in Los Angeles, Chicago, San Francisco, and Albany, New York.

Content
The opening shots of the film show Gray walking toward The Performing Garage in New York City. He enters, and after passing the audience, takes a seat behind a table. On the table are a glass of water, a microphone, and a notebook, the latter brought by Gray. Behind him are two pull-down maps. One is a map of Southeast Asia and the other is a diagram of the bombing of Cambodia, which Gray tells the viewers/audience was called Operation Breakfast. There is also a back-lit projection screen showing a photograph of a beach.

Gray's monologue describes his experiences filming a small role in the film The Killing Fields, and the then-recent history of Cambodia up through the rise to power of the Khmer Rouge and the Cambodian genocide. Three scenes from The Killing Fields that feature Gray are shown at various points in the film.

Production
The soundtrack for the film was composed and performed by Laurie Anderson, who would also score Gray's follow-up film, Monster in a Box. Gray returned the favor by providing the voice of a TV interviewer for her 1986 short film, What You Mean We?. No soundtrack album was released; Anderson later reused music from the film for a series of "Personal Service Announcements" which she produced in 1989 to promote her album, Strange Angels.

While Sam Waterston and Ira Wheeler are credited as cast in this film, they appear only in clips used from The Killing Fields.

Home media
Shout! Factory announced plans for a DVD release of Swimming to Cambodia on May 28, 2013.

Swimming to Cambodia was released in the UK on region 2 DVD on March 16, 2015, by Simply Media.

References

External links

 
 
 
 Review of 'Swimming to Cambodia' (2001), Culture Vulture

1987 films
1987 drama films
American documentary films
American films based on plays
Concert films
Films directed by Jonathan Demme
Films scored by Laurie Anderson
1980s English-language films
1980s American films